Victor Linart (26 May 1889 – 23 October 1977) was a Belgian cyclist. Between 1920 and 1931 he won four UCI Motor-paced World Championships in the professionals division and finished four times in second or third place.

He won his first bicycle race at the age 14, and around that time worked at an ice cream shop making use of his beautiful handwriting. After fighting in World War I he focused on professional cycling. During his career he won 15 national titles (1913–1931) and one unofficial European championship. He was nicknamed "sioux" (by Michel Berthet) due to his dark skin color and nose shape, which was flattened in a fall in 1912. He retired in 1933 and moved to Verneuil-sur-Avre, France, and ran a sawmill nearby. He married Yvonne Cailleaud with whom he had a daughter Monique and son Hubert. For his cycling achievements he was made a knight of the Order of Leopold II. A street is named after him in his native Floreffe and in Verneuil-sur-Avre where he died in 1977.

References

1889 births
1977 deaths
Belgian male cyclists
Cyclists from Namur (province)
Belgian military personnel of World War I
UCI Track Cycling World Champions (men)
People from Floreffe
Belgian track cyclists